Susan Finger is an American engineer whose research involves engineering design and additive manufacturing for mechanical engineering, bioengineering, and building engineering. She is a professor in the Department of Civil and Environmental Engineering at Carnegie Mellon University, where she is also associate dean for the Integrative Design, Arts and Technology Network, and is affiliated with the Institute for Complex Engineered Systems and the School of Architecture.

Education and career
Finger majored in astronomy, with a minor in medieval language and literature, at the University of Pennsylvania, graduating magna cum laude in 1972. She continued at the University of Pennsylvania for a master's degree in operations research in 1974, and completed a Ph.D. in electric power systems and civil engineering at the Massachusetts Institute of Technology in 1981.

She joined Boston University as an assistant professor in the Department of Manufacturing Engineering in 1981. She moved to the National Science Foundation as a program director for design theory and methodology in 1984, later becoming acting deputy division director. In 1987 she came to Carnegie Mellon University as a researcher in the Robotics Institute, and in 1991 she returned to a faculty position as assistant professor of civil engineering.

In CMU's Institute for Complex Engineered Systems, she became the founding director of the Engineering Design Research Lab. With John R. Dixon, she was founding editor-in-chief of the journal Research in Engineering Design, which published its first issue in 1989.

Recognition
Finger was named an ASME Fellow in 2013, for "major contributions in the field of engineering design education and research".

References

External links
Home page

Year of birth missing (living people)
Living people
American civil engineers
American mechanical engineers
American women engineers
University of Pennsylvania alumni
Massachusetts Institute of Technology alumni
Boston University faculty
Carnegie Mellon University faculty
Fellows of the American Society of Mechanical Engineers